Lionel Daniel Clay (1900 – 16 April 1965) was an Australian politician. Born in Chillagoe, Queensland, he attended state schools before becoming a teacher and union organiser, rising to become Vice-President of the Textile Workers Union. In 1958, he was elected to the Australian House of Representatives as the Labor member for the New South Wales seat of St George. He held the seat until his defeat in 1963. Clay died in 1965.

References

Australian Labor Party members of the Parliament of Australia
Members of the Australian House of Representatives for St George
Members of the Australian House of Representatives
1900 births
1965 deaths
Australian trade unionists
Australian schoolteachers
20th-century Australian politicians